La Familia André is a popular Dominican merengue band founded by the late Fernando Echavarría.

References

Dominican Republic musical groups